Alfred Jensen (1903–1981) was a Guatemalan abstract painter.

Alfred Jensen may also refer to:

 Alfred Jensen (politician) (1903–1988), Danish politician and government minister
 Alfred Jensen (slavist) (1859–1921), Swedish historian, slavist, writer, poet
 Alfred J. Jensen (1893–1973), Insurance Commissioner for the State of North Dakota
 Alfred Jensen (Danish painter) (1859–1935), Danish painter of marine art, see SS Cap Polonio